Zaplana may refer to:
 Zaplana, Vrhnika
 Eduardo Zaplana 
 Zaplana, Logatec